VEE or Vee may refer to:

 V, a letter
 VEE, an IC power-supply pin label
 Vee, Estonia, a village
 Vee (surname), including a list of people with the name
 Vee belt, a type of mechanical belt
 VEE Corporation, now VStar Entertainment Group, a family entertainment production company
 Vee Gap, in Ireland
 Vee Mampeezy or Vee (Odirile Ishmael Sento, born 1983), a Botswana musician
 Venezuelan equine encephalitis virus
 Vee, a fictional character in TV series Chuggington
 Yvonne "Vee" Parker, a fictional character in Orange is the New Black

See also
 V (disambiguation)